Guangxi Gymnasium is an indoor sporting arena located in Nanning, China. The capacity of the arena will be 9,247 spectators and opened in 2012.  It hosts indoor sporting events such as basketball and volleyball. It hosted the 2014 World Artistic Gymnastics Championships

References

Indoor arenas in China
Sports venues in Guangxi